The Comstock Prize in Physics is awarded by the U.S. National Academy of Sciences "for recent innovative discovery or investigation in electricity, magnetism, or radiant energy, broadly interpreted."

Honorees must be residents of North America. Named after Cyrus B. Comstock, it has been awarded about every five years since 1913.

List of Comstock Prize winners

See also

 List of physics awards
 Prizes named after people

References

Awards established in 1913
Physics awards
Awards of the United States National Academy of Sciences
1913 establishments in the United States